Jeffrey Zuckerman is a translator of French literature. His work centers on contemporary fiction from mainland France and Mauritius—including Ananda Devi, Shenaz Patel, and Carl de Souza—as well as texts of the queer canon—including Jean Genet and Hervé Guibert. Zuckerman lives in New York City.

Selected translations

Jean-Michel Basquiat
 Les Cahiers (translated into French with David Ferrière, 2018)

Thomas Clerc
 Interior (Farrar, Straus and Giroux, 2018)
 "Out of Debt" (Hotel Cordel no. 1, 2019)

The Dardenne Brothers
 On the Back of Our Images, vol. 1 (Featherproof Books, 2019)

Ananda Devi
 Eve Out of Her Ruins (Deep Vellum, 2016; Les Fugitives, 2016; Speaking Tiger Books, 2017)
 The Living Days (Feminist Press, 2019; Les Fugitives, 2020)
 "Kari Disan" (Words Without Borders, 2017)

Jean Genet
The Criminal Child (New York Review Books, 2020)

Hervé Guibert
Written in Invisble Ink: Selected Stories (Semiotext(e), 2020)
My Manservant and Me: Madcap Novel (Nightboat Books, 2022)

Alain Guiraudie
 Now the Night Begins (Semiotext(e), 2018)

Caroline Laurent
 An Impossible Return (AmazonCrossing, 2022)

Shenaz Patel
Silence of the Chagos (Restless Books, 2019)

Titaua Peu
 Pina (Restless Books, 2022)

Jean-Jacques Schuhl 
 Dusty Pink (Semiotext(e), 2018)

Carl de Souza
 Kaya Days (Two Lines Press, 2021)

Antoine Volodine and his heteronyms
 "The Fringe of Reality" (The White Review, 2014)
 "Post-Exotic Novels, Nȯvelles, and Novelists" (The New Inquiry, 2015)
 "The Year of Octobers" (Hayden's Ferry, 2015)
 Radiant Terminus (Open Letter Books, 2017)
 "Slogans" by Maria Sudayeva (The White Review, 2017)
 Black Village by Lutz Bassmann (Open Letter Books, 2022)

Awards
Zuckerman's translation of Devi's Eve Out of Her Ruins was shortlisted for the Best Translated Book Award, the Albertine Prize, and the TA First Translation Prize, and won the CLMP Firecracker Award. His translation of Devi's The Living Days was shortlisted for the French-American Foundation Translation Prize.
In 2016, Zuckerman was awarded a PEN/Heim Translation Grant to translate Hervé Guibert's short stories.
Several of his translations—including Now the Night Begins, The Living Days, and Black Village—have received French Voices grants ; in 2020, Pina won the Grand Prize.
In 2020, Zuckerman was named a Chevalier dans l’ordre des Arts et des Lettres by the French government.

References

1987 births
American translators
Living people